Marco Hämmerli (born 7 May 1985) is a Swiss football defender, who last played for FC St. Gallen.

External links

football.ch

1985 births
Living people
Swiss men's footballers
FC Wil players
FC Thun players
FC St. Gallen players
Swiss Super League players
Association football defenders